Züsow is a municipality in the Nordwestmecklenburg district, Mecklenburg-Vorpommern, Germany.

References

Nordwestmecklenburg